James Robert Sutton  (born 7 November 1941), generally known as Jim Sutton, is a New Zealand politician who was a Member of Parliament between 1984 and 1990 and again between 1993 and 2006. He has held a range of ministerial portfolios including Agriculture, Forestry, Rural Affairs, Biosecurity, and Trade Negotiations.

Biography
Sutton was born in Reading, Berkshire, England. He came to New Zealand while young, arriving in 1949. He attended Timaru Boys' High School before becoming a farmer. Sutton is married, and has three children.

He has held a number of offices in Federated Farmers, a nationwide agricultural association. He was also Director of Trustbank South Canterbury, chaired the New Zealand Aids Foundation, served as a board member of the Public Health Commission, and was Deputy Chair of both the New Zealand Lotteries Commission and Meridian Energy. His brother Bill Sutton has also been a Labour MP.

Honours and awards
Sutton was appointed as a Companion of the New Zealand Order of Merit in the New Year Honours List 2007 for public services as a member of parliament and Minister of the Crown.

Member of Parliament

Sutton first stood for parliament in the election of 1981, becoming the Labour Party's candidate for the Waitaki electorate. He was unsuccessful against National's Jonathan Elworthy. In the 1984 election, however, he stood again, and won the electorate. Most rural electorates in New Zealand traditionally support the National Party, and so Sutton's victory as a Labour candidate was noteworthy.

Sutton retained his electorate in the 1987 general election, but was defeated in the election of 1990. He returned to farming for three years before being returned to Parliament as the MP for Timaru in the 1993 general election. The switch to the MMP electoral system caused significant redistribution of electorates for the 1996 general election, and Sutton became the MP for Aoraki, which included both of his former electorates.

Ministerial role
Sutton's first ministerial role had come in the dying days of the Fourth Labour Government, shortly before he lost the Waitaki electorate. He served as Minister of Agriculture and Minister of Forestry for most of 1990, leaving cabinet when Labour was defeated in that year's election. However, when Labour won the 1999 general election, Sutton became a minister once again in the Fifth Labour Government. He resumed his Agriculture portfolio while also becoming Minister for Rural Affairs and Minister for Trade Negotiations. In 2001, he gained the Biosecurity portfolio, and in 2002, he regained the Forestry portfolio. In the December 2004 cabinet reshuffle he dropped the Forestry portfolio and for Rural Affairs became Associate Minister.

Retirement from politics
In the 2005 general election, Sutton lost his electorate by a substantial margin, facing the biggest drop in support in any electorate. This has been attributed to anger over things such as school closures, and his role in the "speeding motorcade" affair. He remained in parliament as a list MP, but announced his retirement from politics on 10 July 2006, effective from 1 August 2006. He was replaced from the Labour list by Charles Chauvel.

Sutton subsequently became Ambassador for Trade and the chairman of Landcorp, an appointment renewed by the National government in 2009.

Notes

References

1941 births
Companions of the New Zealand Order of Merit
Living people
Members of the Cabinet of New Zealand
New Zealand farmers
New Zealand Labour Party MPs
People educated at Timaru Boys' High School
New Zealand list MPs
Unsuccessful candidates in the 1990 New Zealand general election
Unsuccessful candidates in the 1981 New Zealand general election
Members of the New Zealand House of Representatives
New Zealand MPs for South Island electorates
21st-century New Zealand politicians